The Qingshui River Bridge (Qingshuihe Bridge) is a suspension bridge in Guizhou, China.

The main span uses a steel truss for deck support and stiffening.

The bridge is part of the Guiweng Expressway. The bridge cost ¥1.54billion (£158million). The bridge was built to improve transportation in the region and will shorten the travel distance between Weng'an County and Guiyang from 160 km down to 38 km. The bridge was opened for traffic on December 31, 2015.

See also
 List of bridges in China
 List of highest bridges in the world
 List of longest suspension bridge spans

References

External links
Qingshuihe Bridge on HighestBridges.com

Bridges in Guizhou
Suspension bridges in China
Bridges completed in 2015